Brimstone is a ground or air-launched ground attack missile developed by MBDA UK for the UK's Royal Air Force. It was originally intended for "fire-and-forget" use against mass formations of enemy armour, using a millimetre wave (mmW) active radar homing seeker to ensure accuracy even against moving targets. Experience in Afghanistan led to the addition of laser guidance in the dual-mode Brimstone missile, allowing a "spotter" to pick out specific and the highest priority targets, particularly useful to minimise collateral damage when friendly forces or civilians were in the area. The tandem shaped-charge warhead is much more effective against modern tanks than older similar weapons such as the AGM-65G Maverick missile. Three Brimstones are carried on a launcher that occupies a single weapon station, allowing a single aircraft to carry many missiles.

After a protracted development programme, single-mode or "millimetric" Brimstone entered service with RAF Tornado aircraft in 2005, and the dual-mode variant in 2008. The latter was used extensively in Afghanistan and Libya. An improved Brimstone 2 was expected to enter service in October 2012, but problems with the new warhead from TDW and the ROXEL rocket motor put back the planned date to November 2015. MBDA is studying the use of Brimstone on ships, attack helicopters, UAVs, and from surface launchers.  However, it will not be integrated on the Lockheed Martin F-35 Lightning II. Germany, Qatar and Saudi Arabia have purchased the missile. The cost per missile has been quoted as £175,000 each in 2015, or "over £100,000".

Design

Overview
The missile was originally supposed to be an evolution of the original laser-guided AGM-114 Hellfire missile, with the laser seeker replaced by a millimetre wave (mmW) seeker. During development, virtually the entire missile was redesigned, resulting in a weapon that – other than the external shape – bears no relation to the original. It is unrelated to the separate development of the mmW Hellfire for the Apache Longbow attack helicopter.

It was estimated that Brimstone would be several times more effective than the AGM-65G Maverick against modern tanks, and 20 times more effective than the BL755 cluster bomb. In combat, Brimstone has demonstrated accuracy and reliability "both well above 90 percent" according to the MoD; Air Chief Marshal Sir Stephen Dalton has said that 98.3% to 98.7% of Brimstone fired in Libya "did exactly what we expected".

Targeting and sensors
Brimstone is a "fire-and-forget" missile, which is loaded with targeting data by the weapon systems officer (WSO) prior to launch. It is programmable to adapt to particular mission requirements. This capability includes the ability to find targets within a certain area (such as those near friendly forces), and to self-destruct if it is unable to find a target within the designated area.

In addition to the semi-autonomous ability to decide its own targets, the Brimstone has the capacity to determine where on a target to best impact causing the most damage.
The missile's advanced sensor package includes its extremely high frequency millimetric wave radar, which allows the weapon to image the target and hence choose a target location. With as many as twenty-four missiles in the air, the missile's targeting system also required an algorithm to ensure that missiles hit their targets in a staggered order, rather than all simultaneously.

Brimstone can be fired in a number of attack profiles; direct or indirect against single targets, a column of targets or against an array of targets. The latter utilises a salvo attack capability for
multiple kills per engagement. Once launched, the platform is free to manoeuvre away from the target area or engage other targets.

Launch system

Each launch system carries three missiles on rails. This allows a single aircraft to carry large numbers of missiles; for example, a Typhoon fighter could carry up to six launch systems, which gives a maximum payload of eighteen Brimstone missiles, in addition to a useful air-to-air payload. The missile was carried by the Tornado GR4 aircraft in RAF service. In February 2014 the National Audit Office warned of a possible capability gap under existing plans to fit Brimstone to Typhoon in 2021, two years after the Tornado retired; in June 2014 the MoD announced a study to accelerate this to 2018 and look at a common launcher that could also launch SPEAR Cap 3. MBDA has fired test rounds from an MQ-9 Reaper drone and is studying the use of Brimstone on attack helicopters and from surface launchers.

It was intended that Brimstone would be integrated on the RAF Harrier aircraft fleet under Capability D of the JUMP programme with a scheduled in-service date of 2009. A Harrier GR9 first flew with 12 Brimstones on 14 February 2007. In late 2009 Brimstone was "nearing completion for integration on the Harrier", but in July 2010 it was reported that this would be postponed until the insensitive-munition version of the missile became available in 2012. Brimstone had not been officially cleared for use on the type when the UK Harriers were withdrawn from service in late 2010.

Development
Brimstone was originally initiated by Marconi Defence Systems and Rockwell International in the late 1980s to meet the RAF's requirement for a long range anti-armour weapon, requiring strike aircraft to attack armoured vehicles at stand-off range and be ten times as effective over older weapons. This requirement was issued in 1982 as a replacement for the BL755 cluster bomb. The programme was initially cancelled in 1990 at the end of the Cold War, but was restarted in 1992 following an assessment of the British military's performance in the Gulf War. GEC-Marconi (whose missile interests now form part of MBDA) was originally awarded the contract on 7 November 1996.

The first ground firing of the Brimstone missile occurred in August 1999, followed by the first air-launched firing from a Tornado GR4 in September 2000. Clearance of the missile was delayed by 12 months due to the unavailability of a Tornado trials aircraft, as the RAF chose instead to rush the development of the Storm Shadow air launched cruise missile ahead of the Iraq war, but another delay of 6 months resulted from redesigning the autopilot for safe release at higher speeds. Over 2,000 missiles were produced.

Dual-Mode Brimstone
The original Brimstone could not be used in Afghanistan as the rules of engagement required a "man-in-the-loop". Under an Urgent Operational Requirement in 2008, modifications were made to the seeker and software of over 300 existing missiles to create Dual-Mode Brimstone. The new missiles can be laser guided according to the STANAG 3733 standard as well as retaining the millimetre wave seeker; the pilot can select either mode from the cockpit or use both simultaneously. Laser guidance allows specific enemy targets to be picked out in cluttered environments, the mmW radar ensures accuracy against moving targets.

The development and procurement of the original single-mode missiles cost £370m, a figure inflated by accounting charges relating to the delays. The development of the dual-mode version cost an additional £10m. The Daily Telegraph reported that the dual mode missiles cost £105,000, which is comparable to the cost of the AGM-65 Maverick; the MoD quote only a gross book value of £175,000, which includes development costs as well as the purchase cost of the missile. Upgrading a single-mode missile to dual mode costs between £35,000 and £45,000 plus VAT, depending on quantities ordered.

Brimstone 2 (SPEAR 2)
In March 2010 Brimstone was selected as the basis for the RAF's requirement under the Selective Precision Effects At Range (SPEAR) Capability 2 Block 1 programme. The Demonstration and Manufacture contract increased the missile's performance "significantly", and converted the warhead and rocket motor to use insensitive munitions. Brimstone 2 has an improved seeker, a more modular design and improvements to airframe and software for "an overall increase in performance with improvements in range and engagement footprint", including a "more than 200% increase" in maximum range. Brimstone 2 was planned to enter service on the Tornado in November 2015, and was further updated with  an insensitive munition compliant rocket motor and warhead in July 2016. It was successfully integrated onto the Tornado GR4 and has trialed on the Eurofighter Typhoon and AH-64E Apache.

In February 2016, integration trials with the Tornado GR4s saw 11 missiles fired at "[various] structures, a very small fast-moving vehicle, and [targets at the] edge of the weapon system’s performance envelope." All in all 10, or 91%, of the 11 missiles were successful; the only missile that missed its target was involved in a very short-range shot in which the missile's semi-active laser homing and millimetric-Wave seekers did not have enough time to effectively acquire its target.

In July 2016, MBDA further proposed a new variant of Brimstone 2 for the AH-64E Apache. It would specifically be for non-armoured targets in land and sea domains, but will not compromise Brimstone's anti-armour capability. It will have a launch aircraft cockpit-selectable trajectory, which will allow line-of-sight engagement (flat trajectory) and high and low missile flight profiles to avoid close-in obstacles; a cockpit-selectable capability that allows the pilot to determine the elevation and impact angle on the target to maximise weapon effect; and a new set of warhead modes, which includes delayed, airburst, impact and proximity fuzing. This weapon will be known as the Future Attack Helicopter Weapon (FAHW).

Naval-launched Brimstone Sea SPEAR
MBDA tested a maritime variant for use against swarms of small boats named Sea SPEAR. On 25 June 2012 a Tornado GR4 dropped a prototype that hit and sank a 6-metre inflatable boat travelling at 20 kn in sea state 3.  On 29 May 2013, MBDA conducted a salvo firing of three millimetric wave operational Brimstone missiles, launched from a fixed offshore platform, against a simulated attack formation of five targets representing FIACs (Fast Inshore Attack Craft). The successful test firing demonstrated Sea SPEAR's ability to strike numerous individual targets. During the test one of the targets, a 15-metre craft, was travelling at 20 knots. MBDA pitted Sea SPEAR against the Raytheon Sea Griffin missile for integration onto American littoral combat ships. The US Navy instead selected the AGM-114L Hellfire as a stop-gap missile for the littoral combat ships.

Brimstone 3
In March 2019, MBDA successfully tested the latest Brimstone 3 version in Sweden, now including surface-to-surface firing, plus new hardware allowing future enhancements.

SPEAR 3

In 2010, MBDA was awarded an assessment phase contract for a network-enabled standoff missile, named SPEAR 3, which reuses technology derived from Brimstone. SPEAR 3 flies at high subsonic speed and can reach ranges of at least . It features a Hamilton Sundstrand TJ-150 turbojet engine, wing kit, multi-mode seeker, INS/GPS guidance and datalink. The missile is designed to equip Eurofighter Typhoon and Lockheed Martin F-35 Lightning II multirole fighter aircraft and is expected to enter service with the Royal Air Force in the mid-2020's. Flight trials were carried out in 2014 from a Eurofighter Typhoon. An electronic warfare version with a swarm capability, named SPEAR EW, has also been proposed.

Operational use

Royal Air Force

In March 2005, Brimstone entered service with No. 31 Squadron RAF. Full Operational Capability (FOC) was declared for the Tornado GR4 in December 2005 The first operational sortie of dual-mode Brimstone was over Iraq as part of Operation Telic on 18 December 2008 by a Tornado GR4 of IX(B) Squadron. It was first fired in combat in June 2009, the month in which the Tornado GR4s of 12 Squadron arrived in Afghanistan as part of Operation Herrick.

Brimstone was used during Operation Ellamy over Libya in 2011. Sixty Brimstone were fired in the first four weeks of the Libya campaign, out of 110 Brimstone fired in all operations up to that time. This prompted the MoD to ask MBDA to convert more missiles to the dual-mode version. 150 dual-mode missiles had been ordered in December 2010, but according to the Royal United Services Institute, stocks of usable dual-mode missiles fell to single figures at one stage of the Libya campaign. The 500th dual-mode Brimstone was delivered in March 2012, at which time over 200 had been fired in combat. The single-mode missile was not fired in combat until 15 September 2011 when a pair of RAF Tornado GR4 of IX(B) Squadron fired 22 missiles (including a salvo of 12 by one aircraft) against an armoured column near Sebha/Sabha, 400 miles south of Tripoli.

In September 2014, Tornado GR4 strike aircraft of No. 2 Squadron RAF began flying armed sorties over Iraq in support of Operation Shader, the UK's contribution to the Military intervention against the Islamic State of Iraq and the Levant. On September 30, the aircraft flew their first bombing raids, engaging a heavy artillery position with a Paveway IV laser-guided bomb, and an armed pickup truck with a Brimstone air-to-ground missile. Brimstone is the preferred weapon for these kinds of targets due to its effectiveness against moving targets.
In December 2015 the UK started using Brimstone missiles in Syria.

Export sales
Around £10 million of Brimstones from the RAF stock were sold to the Royal Saudi Air Force for use on its Tornados. In April 2011, the RAF's Assistant Chief of the Air Staff Air Vice-Marshal Baz North reported that the missiles were "being sought by both the United States of America and the French" in the light of Brimstone's success in Libya. France's DGA procurement agency held meetings in late May 2011 to discuss a lightweight air-to-surface weapon for the Dassault Rafale aircraft; Stéphane Reb of the DGA would merely say that "Brimstone is a solution, but it's not the only option". In early 2014 the US Congress' House Armed Services Committee showed interest again in the missile; high-ranking members of the US armed services have stated they "like it". The French Air Force were still thinking about a purchase in March 2012, with a prime consideration being lower collateral damage compared to the AASM missile. India made a request for information about integrating Brimstone on their Sukhoi Su-30MKI fighter fleet. In July 2014, it was revealed that the United States Navy was studying the Dual Mode Brimstone for use on the Boeing F/A-18E/F Super Hornet aircraft. The United States Army also considered the Brimstone as "an option" in its Joint Air-to-Ground Missile (JAGM) program, but selected Lockheed Martin's dual-mode seeker upgrade for the Hellfire missile. In September 2015, MBDA displayed the dual-mode Brimstone for the first time as a helicopter-mounted weapon to fulfill the British Army Air Corps' need for a future attack helicopter weapon for the AgustaWestland Apache. In January 2016, it was reported that Germany was considering arming its newly leased Heron TP drones with Brimstone. In March 2016, France was reportedly considering Brimstone for its Tiger attack helicopters.

In December 2017 it was announced that Qatar had purchased Brimstone missiles to arm its Eurofighter Typhoon fighter aircraft. In September 2019, MBDA was reportedly partnering with the Polish defence firm PGZ to produce a Brimstone carrying missile tank destroyer. The two proposed variants consist of one vehicle based on a modernised BMP-1 infantry fighting vehicle chassis, carrying a launch module of 12 missiles. The other is based on the K9 Thunder howitzer chassis, featuring three launch modules of eight missiles each.

In April 2022, the UK Ministry of Defence supplied Brimstones to the Ukrainian Armed Forces for use as a surface-launched ground-attack system to strike Russian ground forces. By 12 May 2022, training on a surface-launch system was happening in Ukraine. On 17 May 2022, it was claimed that ground-launched Brimstone missiles had destroyed two Russian targets. It is claimed that these two targets are Russian tanks, operating behind their lines, and the missiles were fired by Ukrainian soldiers. If correct, it would be the first time a surface-launched Brimstone missile has destroyed a target.

In May 2022 MBDA and the Polish Armaments Group announced that Brimstone would arm the latter's upcoming tank destroyer.

On 22 November, the UK has started supplying Brimstone 2 missiles to Ukraine. Brought into service in 2016 it has double the range of the first Brimstone. It has an inertial navigation system and can get to an area on autopilot before choosing targets autonomously. However it is still being fired by trucks which reduce its range compared to air launched versions since a ground launched missile lacks "an aircraft's speed and altitude".

Operators

Current operators

Royal Saudi Air Force

Royal Air Force

German Air Force

Ukrainian Armed Forces

Future operators

Qatar Emiri Air Force

Polish Land Forces

Spanish Air Force

See also
 UMTAS
 AGM-114 Hellfire
 AGM-169 Joint Common Missile
 AGM-179 JAGM
 Barq
 9K121 Vikhr
 Mokopa
 Helina
 Nimrod (missile)
 PARS 3 LR

Notes

References

Sources

External links
 Brimstone Project Details and Specifications
 RAF page on Brimstone missile
 Brimstone Sea SPEAR

Anti-tank guided missiles of the United Kingdom
Post–Cold War missiles of the United Kingdom
Military equipment introduced in the 2000s
Fire-and-forget weapons
Air-to-surface missiles of the United Kingdom